Thomas Ulsrud (21 October 1971 – 24 May 2022) was a Norwegian curler from Oslo. He won a silver medal at the 2010 Winter Olympics, one World Curling Championship, two European Curling Championships, and fourteen Norwegian titles (Norwegian Men's Curling Championship and Oslo Cup). He was also known for being the skip of the team that competed while wearing colourful harlequin trousers at the Vancouver 2010 Winter Olympics. Team Ulsrud's combined showmanship and sportsmanship became iconic and contributed to reviving worldwide interest in curling until 2019.

Career

Early career
Ulsrud began competing from 1983. In his second World Junior Curling Championship in 1988, Ulsrud skipped Norway to a bronze medal.

In 1997, he skipped in his first European Curling Championships, finishing in seventh place. Team Ulsrud competed again in 2000–2003, 2006–2009, winning bronze in 2002, silver in 2007, and bronze in 2009.

In his first World Curling Championship in 1998, Ulsrud skipped Norway to fifth place. After serving as the alternate for Pål Trulsen's team in 1999, he returned again as skip in 2006–2009, making the playoffs for the first time in 2006 and then defeated USA's Team Pete Fenson to win the bronze medal. Two more bronze medals followed in 2008 and 2009.

Between 2007 and 2010, Team Ulsrud won six World Curling Tour events, namely, the 2007 and 2009 Lucerne Curling Trophies, 2008 Baden Masters, 2008 Radisson SAS Oslo Cup, 2009 Swiss Cup Basel, and 2009 Bern Open.

2010-2015

At the 2010 Vancouver Winter Olympics, Team Ulsrud attracted worldwide attention, not only for introducing Loudmouth Golf's colourful harlequin pants to the arena, but also for winning the silver medal after the final game against Canada's Team Kevin Martin.

Immediately at the start of the 2010 World Curling Championship in Cortina d'Ampezzo, Italy, Ulsrud had to return home for family reasons. With Torger Nergård acting as skip, Ulsrud's teammates took first place at the end of round-robin games (10–1 score) and won the silver medal.

Team Ulsrud began the 2010-11 curling season by winning their first European Curling Championship gold medal in Champéry, Switzerland. The team topped the season off by finishing fourth at the 2011 Ford World Men's Curling Championship.

The rink won a second straight European Championships by winning the gold medal at the 2011 European Curling Championships. Later that season they would once again finish 4th at the 2012 World Men's Curling Championship. That season, the team won one WCT event, the 2012 European Masters.

The Ulsrud rink would continue their domination at the European championship by winning the silver medal at both the 2012 and 2013 events. They were less successful at the 2013 Ford World Men's Curling Championship, finishing in 5th place. The rink represented Norway once again at the 2014 Winter Olympics, where they finished 5th, with a 5-5 record. They lost in a tie-breaker match to Great Britain, skipped by David Murdoch. On the World Curling Tour, the team won one event in 2013-14, the 2013 Swiss Cup Basel. The team capped off their season by winning a gold medal at the 2014 World Men's Curling Championship.

The World champion Ulsrud rink began the 2014–15 curling season by winning the first WCT event of the year, the 2014 Baden Masters. That season, he won another silver medal at the 2014 European Curling Championships and won a silver medal at the 2015 World Men's Curling Championship, losing to Sweden's Niklas Edin rink in the final. The next season, Ulsrud led his team to a silver medal at the 2015 European Curling Championships and a disappointing sixth place finish at the 2016 World Men's Curling Championship.

2016-2020
In 2016, Ulsrud won another silver medal at the European Curling Championships, which he followed up by winning the Qinghai China Men's International on the tour the next month. Later in the season, he lost in a best-of-five challenge against Steffen Walstad which would have qualified his team for the 2017 World Championships. Team Ulsrud did get to represent Norway one last time at the 2017 European Curling Championships, where they finished in fourth place.

In 2018, Ulsrud and his team represented Norway at the PyeongChang Winter Olympics, placing sixth. They began the 2018–19 curling season by winning the Baden Masters for the third time in their career. Ulsrud paired up with Kristin Skaslien at the third leg of the 2018–19 Curling World Cup in the mixed doubles event. The pair made it to the final, losing to Canada's Kadriana Sahaidak and Colton Lott. It was Ulsrud's first experience in mixed doubles. 

In 2019, after a light curling season where they did not play in any Grand Slam events, Team Ulsrud announced that they would be disbanding at the end of the season. In their farewell message, they humorously thanked "Team Niklas Edin, Team David Murdoch, Team Kevin Martin, Team Kevin Koe and Team Sven Michel for turning those nine potential golds into beautiful silver medals". 
Afterwards, Ulsrud formed a new team with Steffen Walstad, Markus Høiberg and Magnus Vågberg, and they represented Norway at the 2019 European Curling Championships, holding a 5–4 record and missing the playoffs. It was Ulsrud's final European Championship appearance. Later in the season, the team finished second at the Norwegian Men's Curling Championship, which was Ulsrud's fifth straight second place finish. 

His team were set to represent Norway at the 2020 World Men's Curling Championship but it was cancelled due to the COVID-19 pandemic. Torger Nergård rejoined with Ulsrud as third, replacing Walstad, and the team played in only three domestic events because of continuing COVID-19 restrictions. It would be Ulsrud's final season, as he was diagnosed with cancer in December 2020.

Personal life
Ulsrud became interested in curling at age 10 when his stepfather introduced him to the sport. When not being an athlete, Ulsrud was self-employed. He was married to Elin Grødal, and they had one son, Jesper.

Ulsrud died on 24 May 2022 from cancer, aged 50. A memorial service was held on 3 June 2022 at Ullern Church, Oslo. His former teammates remembered him for his friendship and his "inclusiveness" during their years of travelling and competing together. Tributes also came from the World Curling Federation, notably, President and Scottish curler, Kate Caithness, who praised Ulsrud and Team Norway for raising the status and popularity of curling, "They were huge ambassadors for the sport".

Teams

Grand Slam record

References

External links
 
 
 
 
 
  
 World Curling TV: Norway

1971 births
2022 deaths
Norwegian male curlers
Sportspeople from Oslo
Curlers at the 2010 Winter Olympics
Curlers at the 2014 Winter Olympics
Curlers at the 2018 Winter Olympics
Olympic curlers of Norway
Olympic silver medalists for Norway
Olympic medalists in curling
Medalists at the 2010 Winter Olympics
World curling champions
Continental Cup of Curling participants
European curling champions
Deaths from cancer in Norway